Cueva Las Maravillas Airport  is an airport  east of San Pedro de Macorís, capital of the San Pedro de Macorís Province in the Dominican Republic. The airport  was opened on February 7, 2008.

Cueva Las Maravillas Airport has many flights to and from other airports in the Dominican Republic, bringing tourists for Cueva de las Maravillas National Park, which features a popular natural cavern complex.

Airlines and destinations

See also

Transport in Dominican Republic
List of airports in Dominican Republic

References

External links
OpenStreetMap - Cueva Las Maravillas Airport
Bing Maps - Cueva Las Maravillas Airport

Airports in the Dominican Republic
Buildings and structures in San Pedro de Macorís Province